Justin Chart (born ) is an American singer-songwriter, producer and performer of improvisational jazz. He is best known for free-form jazz performances and for "Los Angeles the Song", a song dedicated to the city of his birth. Nicknamed the "Blizzard" for his playing style and compositional changes, Chart has written songs for numerous films and television shows.  He has produced thirteen albums in during his five-decade career.

Early life 

Chart was born in Los Angeles, California, to Lee and Betty Chart. His father was a professional boxer who loved jazz. His mother was a professional opera singer who performed in New York, Chicago, Illinois, and Los Angeles, and California. Chart credits his parents with inspiring his music career. Chart started playing piano at the age of 5 and by the age of 11 had learned to play the clarinet as well as alto and baritone saxophone.
Chart recalls: "Listening to my Mom sing opera around the house and sitting down with my Dad to listen to his jazz records" while growing up. Chart's musical idols included Charlie Parker, Sonny Stitt, Bill Evans, Art Tatum and Cannonball Adderley. As a teenager, he was chosen to record an album with two orchestras as soloist. After high school, Chart studied music at the School of the Performing Arts in London, England.

Career 
Chart is best-known for improvising free-form jazz pieces. Recently, Chart released Colorstorm (2020), followed by Colorstorm IV (2021) and Colorstorm VI (2021). Colorstorm was recorded live, in one session in Los Angeles. The album, which consists of group improvisational pieces, was recorded in the midst of the COVID-19 pandemic. Every performance on was the only version of that particular work, and no editing or overdubbing was done to change the group's improvisational offering.

"Los Angeles the Song" 

In 2012, Chart wrote, sang and produced "Los Angeles the Song", dedicated to the city of his birth. He created twelve different versions of the track, accompanied by music videos: "Los Angeles La Cancion", "Los Angeles Dance Angeles", "Los Angeles Latin", "Los Angeles Word", "Los Angeles Voice of the World" and "Los Angeles a City Alive."

In "Los Angeles Voice of the World", Chart performs together with 40 singers and three rappers from all 25 of Los Angeles' sister cities. The cast sang in 28 different languages spoken by people on six different continents, as a gesture to L.A.'s multicultural flavor. The videos of the song feature scenes from L.A. including the Venice boardwalk, downtown Los Angeles, and ethnic neighborhoods. "Los Angeles Dance Angeles" has a Latin beat and features Chart's daughter Tali on keyboard. "Los Angeles Word" features black-and-white Wild West photos of orange groves, dusty roads and horse-drawn carriages in the early years of L.A., juxtaposed with modern automobiles.

The various versions of "Los Angeles the Song" have garnered more than 11 million views on YouTube and attracted notice from public officials. Chart was awarded the Artisan Appreciation Award in July 2014 by L.A. Mayor Eric Garcetti, who praised his ability to capture "through song for people to enjoy and understand this passion for the city we all call home."

Discography

Albums 

The February Feeling (1993, remastered and released in 2017)
 Return of the Knight (1995, remastered and released in 2017)
 Los Angeles: An Anthem (2017)
 All That Is Just (2018)
 The Jammiest Bit O Jam (2019)
 Colorstorm (2020)
 Colorstorm IV (2021)
Colorstorm VI (2021)
Intuition (2021)
Live in Los Angeles (2021)
The Scarlet Jazz Room (2022)
The Midnight People (2022)
Keep the Blue (2022)

Personal life 
Chart lives in Los Angeles and has a daughter, Tali.

References

External links 

Justin Chart Jazz

1960 births
Living people
Musicians from Los Angeles
American male singers
Singers from California
American jazz saxophonists